Switzerland participated at the Eurovision Song Contest 2006 with the song "If We All Give a Little" written by Ralph Siegel and Bernd Meinunger. The song was performed by the group six4one, which was internally selected by the Swiss broadcaster SRG SSR idée suisse in November 2005 to represent the nation at the 2006 contest in Athens, Greece. "If We All Give a Little" was presented to the public as the Swiss song on 18 March 2006.

As one of the ten highest placed finishers in 2005, Switzerland automatically qualified to compete in the final of the Eurovision Song Contest. Performing as the opening entry for the show in position 1, Switzerland placed sixteenth out of the 24 participating countries with 30 points.

Background

Prior to the 2006 contest, Switzerland had participated in the Eurovision Song Contest forty-six times since its first entry in 1956. Switzerland is noted for having won the first edition of the Eurovision Song Contest with the song "Refrain" performed by Lys Assia. Their second and, to this point, most recent victory was achieved in 1988 when Canadian singer Céline Dion won the contest with the song "Ne partez pas sans moi". In 2005, the internal selection of Estonian girl band Vanilla Ninja, performing the song "Cool Vibes", qualified Switzerland to the final where they placed 8th.

The Swiss national broadcaster, SRG SSR idée suisse, broadcasts the event within Switzerland and organises the selection process for the nation's entry. SRG SSR idée suisse confirmed their intentions to participate at the 2006 Eurovision Song Contest on 22 July 2005. Along with their participation confirmation, the broadcaster also announced that the Swiss entry for the 2006 contest would be selected internally. Switzerland has selected their entry for the Eurovision Song Contest through both national finals and internal selections in the past. Since 2005, the Swiss entry was internally selected for the competition.

Before Eurovision

Internal selection 
On 22 July 2005, SRG SSR idée suisse opened a submission period for interested composers to submit their songs until 14 October 2005. On 14 December 2005, the broadcaster announced that Ralph Siegel and Bernd Meinunger had written the song that would represent Switzerland in Athens. Siegel had previously composed 17 Eurovision entries for various countries, 14 of them which were written by Meinunger. Meinunger had also written the Swiss entry in 2005 (under the pseudonym John O'Flynn). The song was selected by a jury panel consisting of representatives of the three broadcasters in Switzerland: the Swiss-German/Romansh broadcaster Schweizer Fernsehen der deutschen und rätoromanischen Schweiz (SF DRS), the Swiss-French broadcaster Télévision Suisse Romande (TSR) and the Swiss-Italian broadcaster Televisione svizzera di lingua italiana (TSI). 

Performer auditions took place between 25 and 27 November 2005 at the Olympia Studios in Munich where Siegel together with an expert panel consisting of representatives of SF DRS, TSR and RSI selected six artists from six different countries to form the group six4one for the Eurovision Song Contest. Eligible artists were those that have had television and stage experience (live performances), have made at least one video and have released at least one CD which placed among the top 50 in an official chart. "If We All Give a Little" was presented to the public as the song on 18 March 2006 during the SF1 show Benissimo.

Members 
 Andreas Lundstedt comes from Sweden and is a member of the group Alcazar.
 Claudia D'Addio comes from Switzerland. She is known as "The Voice" and earned her fame from the casting show MusicStar.
 Keith Camilleri comes from Malta and is known in his homeland for his passionate voice and his regular guest appearance on Maltese shows.
 Liel comes from Israel and advocates peace in the world with her songs.
 Marco Matias has a Portuguese background but comes from Germany. He participated in the 2005 German national final Germany 12 Points! with Nicole Süßmilch and reached second place.
 Tinka Milinović comes from Bosnia and Herzegovina and is a very popular performer and radio/television host.

At Eurovision

According to Eurovision rules, all nations with the exceptions of the host country, the "Big Four" (France, Germany, Spain and the United Kingdom) and the ten highest placed finishers in the 2005 contest are required to qualify from the semi-final in order to compete for the final; the top ten countries from the semi-final progress to the final. As one of the ten highest placed finishers in the 2005 contest, Switzerland automatically qualified to compete in the final on 20 May 2006. On 21 March 2006, a special allocation draw was held which determined the running order and Switzerland was set to open the final and perform in position 1, before the entry from Moldova. Switzerland placed sixteenth in the final, scoring 30 points.

In Switzerland, three broadcasters that form SRG SSR idée suisse aired the contest. 1991 Swiss Eurovision Song Contest entrant Sandra Studer provided German commentary both shows airing on SF zwei. Jean-Marc Richard and Alain Morisod provided French commentary on TSR 2 for the semi-final and on TSR 1 for the final. Sandy Altermatt and Claudio Lazzarino provided Italian commentary for the semi-final on TSI 2 and the final on TSI 1. The Swiss spokesperson, who announced the Swiss votes during the final, was Jubaira Bachmann.

Voting 
Below is a breakdown of points awarded to Switzerland and awarded by Switzerland in the semi-final and grand final of the contest. The nation awarded its 12 points to Bosnia and Herzegovina in the semi-final and the final of the contest.

Points awarded to Switzerland

Points awarded by Switzerland

References

2006
Countries in the Eurovision Song Contest 2006
Eurovision